is a 2003 Japanese film directed by Kiyoshi Sasabe.

Awards
Won: 2003 Directors Guild of Japan New Directors Award - Kiyoshi Sasabe

References

External links
 

2003 films
Films directed by Kiyoshi Sasabe
2000s Japanese films